Bibliophobia is the fear or hatred of books. Such fear often arises from fear of the effect books can have on society or culture. Bibliophobia is a common cause of censorship and book burning. Bibliophobia and bibliophilia are antonyms.

History
In his 1999 Matthews lecture at Birkbeck College, Tom Shippey discussed bibliophobia in the Middle Ages.  This arose when the literate professions, such as the clergy and beadles, would exploit and terrify the illiterate masses by their command of texts such as religious and legal documents.  He illustrated this with examples from Anglo-Saxon literature such as The Pardoner's Tale.

In popular culture
Fahrenheit 451 and other works by Ray Bradbury
Spanish Inquisition book censorship
Index Librorum Prohibitorum

See also
List of banned books
Bibliophilia

References

Further reading

Book censorship